Tsz Tong Tsuen is the name of several villages in Hong Kong:

 Tsz Tong Tsuen (North District) in North District
 Tsz Tong Tsuen (Tai Po) in Tai Po District
 Tsz Tong Tsuen (Kam Tin) in Kam Tin, Yuen Long District
 Tsz Tong Tsuen (Shek Kong) in Shek Kong, Yuen Long District